The 2016 Indonesia Super Series Premier was the fifth Super Series tournament of the 2016 BWF Super Series. The tournament took place in Jakarta, Indonesia from 30 May–5 June 2016 with a total purse of $900,000.

Men's singles

Seeds

Top half

Bottom half

Finals

Women's singles

Seeds

Top half

Bottom half

Finals

Men's doubles

Seeds

Top half

Bottom half

Finals

Women's doubles

Seeds

Top half

Bottom half

Finals

Mixed doubles

Seeds

Top half

Bottom half

Finals

Sponsorships 
 Bank BCA
 Djarum
 Toyota
 Samsung
 Konimex
 100 Plus
 Li-Ning
 Victor

References

External links
 PBSI | Championship Calendar at www.badmintonindonesia.org 
 BWF World Super Series at www.bwfworldsuperseries.com

Indonesia Open (badminton)
Indonesia Super Series Premier
Sport in Indonesia
2016 in Indonesian sport
May 2016 sports events in Asia
June 2016 sports events in Asia